Haitian rapper and singer Wyclef Jean has released nine studio albums, one compilation album, two extended plays and 25 singles.

Albums

Studio albums

Compilation albums
 Greatest Hits (2003)

Mixtapes

EPs
 If I Were President: My Haitian Experience (2010)
 J'ouvert (2017)

Singles

Lead appearances

Featured appearances

Album appearances

Notes

References

Discographies of American artists
Discographies of Haitian artists
Discography